John 20:31 is the thirty-first (and the last) verse of the twentieth chapter of the Gospel of John in the New Testament. It contains the statement of purpose for the whole gospel.

Content
The original Koine Greek, according to the Textus Receptus, reads:

In the King James Version of the Bible it is translated as:
But these are written, that ye might believe that Jesus is the Christ, the Son of God; and that believing ye might have life through his name.

The modern World English Bible translates the passage as:
but these are written, that you may believe that Jesus is the Christ, the Son of God, and that believing you may have life in his name.

For a collection of other versions see BibleHub John 20:31

Analysis
This verse and the following form a first epilogue of what the author calls "this book". These two verses are linked to what precedes with the particles men oun ("therefore"), such that 'those who have not seen the risen Christ and yet believed are blessed; therefore this book has been composed, to the end that you may believe'. The particle men is then paired with 'de' in verse 31 to frame the idea from the two verses, such that on the one hand many more signs of Jesus could not be reported, but on the other 'these have been committed to writing so that you may believe'.

This verse is considered 'the shortest summary of Johannine theology', that to expound each word or phrase in detail requires one to expound the whole book. The combination of Jesus' 'Messiahship and divine sonship' becomes the ultimate conclusion of the presentation of Jesus in this gospel.

References

Sources

External links
Jesus Appears to His Disciples

20:31
John 20:31